Fillmore is a village in Montgomery County, Illinois, United States. The population was 362 at the 2000 census.

Geography

Demographics

As of the census of 2000, there were 362 people, 144 households, and 103 families residing in the village. The racial makeup of the village was 98.62% White, 0.28% Asian, and 1.10% from two or more races. Hispanic or Latino of any race were 1.38% of the population.

There were 144 households, out of which 33.3% had children under the age of 18 living with them, 58.3% were married couples living together, 9.7% had a female householder with no husband present, and 27.8% were non-families. 27.1% of all households were made up of individuals, and 16.0% had someone living alone who was 65 years of age or older. The average household size was 2.51 and the average family size was 3.01.

In the village, the age distribution of the population shows 27.6% under the age of 18, 7.7% from 18 to 24, 27.9% from 25 to 44, 19.1% from 45 to 64, and 17.7% who were 65 years of age or older. The median age was 37 years. For every 100 females, there were 93.6 males. For every 100 females age 18 and over, there were 85.8 males.

The median income for a household in the village was $30,313, and the median income for a family was $35,750. Males had a median income of $31,250 versus $18,333 for females. The per capita income for the village was $14,363. About 18.2% of families and 21.6% of the population were below the poverty line, including 36.4% of those under age 18 and 18.6% of those age 65 or over.

Notable people 

 Ray Richmond, pitcher for the St. Louis Browns; born in Fillmore
 Walter Short, United States Army Major General; born in Fillmore

References

External links
Fillmore Illinois, Historical Society of Montgomery County Illinois

Villages in Montgomery County, Illinois
Villages in Illinois